The November 2016 Diyarbakır bombing was an explosion near a police building in Bağlar, Diyarbakır in Turkey, on 4 November. The bomb killed at least 11 people, including two policemen. Both the Islamic State of Iraq and the Levant and the Kurdistan Freedom Hawks claimed responsibility for the bombing.

See also
February 2016 Diyarbakır bombing
March 2016 Diyarbakır bombing
May 2016 Diyarbakır bombing
List of terrorist incidents in November 2016

References

ISIL terrorist incidents in Turkey
Mass murder in Turkey
Mass murder in 2016
November 2016 events in Turkey
November 2016 crimes in Asia
Terrorist incidents in Diyarbakır
Terrorist incidents in Turkey in 2016